A monster truck is a custom-built vehicle with greatly oversized wheels.

Monster Truck or Monster Trucks may also refer to:

 Monster Truck (band), a Canadian rock band
 Monster Trucks (film), a sci-fi action film released in late 2016
 "Monster Trucks", a 2001 episode of Modern Marvels
 "Monster Truck", a 2001 episode of Scrapheap Challenge
 "Monster Trucks", a 2006 episode of Police Camera Action!
 "Monster Trucks", a 2008 episode of America's Toughest Jobs
 Dark Haul, a 2014 TV movie starring Tom Sizemore, also known as Monster Truck
 Rolling Vengeance, a 1987 exploitation film also known Monster Truck
 Mini monster truck

See also 
 List of monster trucks